Futebol Clube de Famalicão, commonly known as Famalicão, is a Portuguese football club from Vila Nova de Famalicão. Founded on 21 August 1931, its senior team currently plays in the Primeira Liga, the top tier of Portuguese football.

Since 1952, Famalicão have played their home matches at the Estádio Municipal 22 de Junho, which holds a 5,307-seat capacity. The Famalicenses' most successful period of their history occurred in the early 1990s, where the club played four seasons in the Primeira Liga, between 1990 and 1994, counting now with seven Primeira Liga appearances. The club is owned by Quantum Pacific Group which also has 30% share of Atlético de Madrid.

History 

Futebol Clube de Famalicão was founded on the 21 August 1931 by six friends. Their first match was the opening of their ground, the Campo da Berberia, with a match against FC Porto in 1932. Their first kit was green and white, however, they eventually changed it to blue and white in order to get affiliation from Porto. Famalicão started competing in 1932–33 in the Regional Promotion Championship which they won. In 1945–46, the club reached the semi-finals of the Taça de Portugal under Hungarian manager Janos Szabo, but were beaten 11–0 by a Sporting CP team led by Cândido de Oliveira.

The club have spent six years in the Primeira Liga in total - 1946–47, 1978–79, and four consecutively from 1990 to 1994. The 2000s brought a fast fall with the club dropping as far as the regional championships. Having fallen as low as the fifth-tier Braga Football Association district league in 2008–09, Famalicão returned to Segunda Liga for the first time in 19 years in May 2015 by winning their group in the Campeonato Nacional de Seniores. Even in that years, the club archived records from his supporters attendance, playing home or away.  They lost the final on penalties to C.D. Mafra after a 1–1 draw at the Estádio Municipal da Marinha Grande on 10 June.

At the beginning of the 2018–19 season, 51% of the club share was bought by Quantum Pacific Group, a group led by Israeli businessman Idan Ofer that also holds 33% of Atlético de Madrid. On 28 April 2019, the club won promotion to the top flight for the first time in a quarter of a century.

On 11 September 2019, Quantum Pacific Group increased its share in the Sociedade Anónima Desportiva of the club from 51% to 85%, spearheaded by Israeli billionaire Idan Ofer. With a 1–0 win over F.C. Paços de Ferreira in January 2020, the club reached the semi-finals of the cup for the first time since 1946.

The club plays their home games at Estádio Municipal de Famalicão and have occupied the stadium since its opening in 1952. The club's previous grounds were Campo da Berberia, opened in 1932, and Campo do Freião, opened in 1946. Works on the stadium were planned for 2019 to increase the comfort and technology of the stadium, as well as expanding its capacity to 7,500.

Players

Current squad

Out on loan

Competitions

Trophies

Participations

Season by season 

 Promotion stage

 Relegation stage CNS

Crest

References

External links

FC Famalicão ZeroZero profile
ForaDeJogo.net FC Famalicão profile

 
Football clubs in Portugal
Association football clubs established in 1931
1931 establishments in Portugal
Primeira Liga clubs
Liga Portugal 2 clubs